Death Piggy was an American hardcore punk band, that was formed in 1982 in Richmond, Virginia. They flourished briefly, before Dave Brockie, then their lead singer/bassist, decided to play a joke set while wearing monster costumes made by VCU art student Colette Miller, as an opening act for Death Piggy. This joke act would later be the basis for the heavy metal band GWAR. They put out a few 45s (some limited to 301 copies) and had a small yet loyal following.  They played their last show in 1994, before the death of drummer Sean Sumner.

Members

Original lineup
Dave Brockie: Lead Vocals/Bass (a.k.a. Oderus Urungus from Gwar)
Russ Bahorsky: Guitar/Vocals
Sean Sumner: Drums

Later members
Steve Douglas: guitar (replaced Russ after the "Death Rules the Fairway" single)

Discography
Love War 7-inch EP (1983)
G-O-D Spells God
Spatter Flick
Eat The People
Fat Man
Nympho
Bathtub In Space
No Prob, Dude
Mangoes & Goats

Death Rules the Fairway 7-inch EP (1984)
Welcome To The Record
Boner
Showbiz
Dinner In The Morning
Whippin' Round The Bay
Ceramic Butt

R45 7-inch EP (1985)
Poet
Ground "B" Sound
Joey Died Today
Minute 2 Live

Smile Or Die!!! (1999)
compilation of all of the above 45s
Studio Sessions 1984/85 (2016)
Vinyl re-release of Smile Or Die!!! with new artwork, exclusive to Spain
Welcome To The Record (September 26, 2020, Record Store Day exclusive, gold vinyl, 1000 copies)
Vinyl compilation of Smile Or Die!!! with 3 additional tracks: Scabs / Ewoks / Fear of Murder
Also included a digital download that included 20 minute never-before heard live improv acoustic set from 1984, recorded as the band surprised business owners and pedestrians on the street with an impromptu performance.

References

Musical groups established in 1982
Hardcore punk groups from Virginia
Gwar
Heavy metal musical groups from Virginia
1982 establishments in Virginia